Sundridge Park railway station serves Sundridge and Plaistow in the London Borough of Bromley in Greater London, in Travelcard Zone 4.

The station, and all trains serving it, are operated by Southeastern.

Location
Sundridge Park station is located between Bromley and Grove Park, on Plaistow Lane, Bromley, on the northern edge of the borough of Bromley. The station is so close to Bromley North (just  up the line) that the latter's platform indicator is a part of the starting signal for the southbound platform.

Services 

All services at Sundridge Park are operated by Southeastern using  EMUs.

The typical off-peak service in trains per hour is:
 2 tph to 
 2 tph to 

No services call at the station on Sundays or on Bank Holidays.

During testing of the Class 376 Electrostars by South Eastern Trains in 2004, the station gained a service to London Bridge. This service was withdrawn after testing, leaving the station with a branch line only service once more.

Connections
London Buses route 314 serves the station.

Future proposals
These schemes have not been taken beyond the proposal stage and recommendations are expected to be published around 2017.

References

External links 

Railway stations in the London Borough of Bromley
Former South Eastern Railway (UK) stations
Railway stations in Great Britain opened in 1878
Railway stations served by Southeastern